Aleksandar or Saša Petrović may refer to:

Basketball 
Aleksandar Petrović (basketball, born February 1959), Croatian professional basketball coach and former player
Aleksandar Petrović (basketball, born October 1959) (1959–2014), Serbian professional basketball coach
Aleksandar Petrović (basketball, born 1972), Macedonian professional basketball coach
Aleksandar Petrović (basketball, born 1987), Serbian professional basketball player

Football 
Aleksandar Petrović (footballer, born 1914) (1914–1987), former Serbian football player and manager
Aleksandar Petrović (footballer, born 1983), Serbian professional football for Concordia Chiajna in Romanian Liga I
Aleksandar Petrović (footballer, born 1985), Serbian footballer for Serbian SuperLiga club FK Rad Belgrade
Aleksandar R. Petrović (born 1985), Serbian footballer in Serbian SuperLiga club FK Metalac Gornji Milanovac
Saša Petrović (footballer) (born 1966), Montenegrin football manager and former goalkeeper

Other 
Aleksandar Petrović (film director) (1929–1994), Serbian film director
Aleksandar Petrović (musician), a member of the Orthodox Celts
Aleksandar Petrović (priest) (1917–1944), Serbian Righteous Among the Nations
Saša Petrović (actor) (1962–2023), Bosnian actor
Alex Petrovic (born 1992), Canadian ice-hockey player

See also 
Aleksandro Petrović (born 1988), Bosnian/German footballer